Sagita Island is a rocky island lying off the northeast coast of Astrolabe Island in Bransfield Strait, Antarctica. It is 280 m long in the southwest-northeast direction and 180 m wide

The island is named after the ocean fishing trawler Sagita of the Bulgarian company Ocean Fisheries – Burgas that operated in Antarctic waters off South Georgia during its fishing trips under Captain Ivan Krastanov from February 1978 to July 1978, and under Captain Yordan Yordanov from December 1979 to June 1980. Apart from fishing, on the latter occasion the ship carried out fisheries research by an onboard scientific team. The Bulgarian fishermen, along with those of the Soviet Union, Poland and East Germany are the pioneers of modern Antarctic fishing industry.

Location
German-British mapping in 1996.

Maps
 Trinity Peninsula. Scale 1:250000 topographic map No. 5697. Institut für Angewandte Geodäsie and British Antarctic Survey, 1996.
 Antarctic Digital Database (ADD). Scale 1:250000 topographic map of Antarctica. Scientific Committee on Antarctic Research (SCAR). Since 1993, regularly upgraded and updated.

Notes

References
 Sagita Island. SCAR Composite Gazetteer of Antarctica.
 Bulgarian Antarctic Gazetteer. Antarctic Place-names Commission. (details in Bulgarian, basic data in English)

External links
 Sagita Island. Copernix satellite image

Islands of Trinity Peninsula
Astrolabe Island
Ocean Fisheries – Burgas Co
Bulgaria and the Antarctic